Philip Jackson Cook (born October 15, 1946) is the ITT/Terry Sanford Professor of Public Policy at the Sanford School of Public Policy at Duke University in the United States. He also holds faculty appointments in Duke's departments of sociology, and economics. His research has focused on crime and criminal justice policy; weapons and violent crime; health and safety regulation including alcohol taxation and the societal costs of drinking; the economics of state lotteries; and income distribution.

Career
Cook has written several books about gun violence in the United States. He is the author of Gun Violence: The Real Costs, a book published by Oxford University Press in 2000. Cook presents a view on gun violence from an economic perspective.  He has also edited Evaluating Gun Policy, which was published in 2003 by the Brookings Institution. Cook's most recent book is The Gun Debate: What Everyone Needs to Know, which was published by Oxford University Press in 2014.

Cook has served on the National Research Council’s Committee on Law and Justice.  He has also been on National Academy of Sciences panels, including the 1994 panel on "Understanding and Control of Violent Behavior", 1981 panel on "Alternative Policies Affecting the Prevention of Alcohol Abuse and Alcoholism", among others.

Cook was awarded the 2020 Stockholm Prize in Criminology for his research on gun violence.

Selected works
 2007: Paying the Tab: The Economics of Alcohol Policy 
 1989, 1991(paperback), with Charles T. Clotfelter: Selling Hope: State Lotteries in America , 
 1996, with Robert H. Frank: The Winner-Take-All Society 
 1987, Cook P. J . (1987), ‘Robbery Violence’, Journal of Criminal Law and Criminology, 78: 357–76.

References

External links

American criminologists
21st-century American economists
Duke University faculty
1946 births
Living people
Researchers in alcohol abuse
Gun violence researchers
Members of the National Academy of Medicine
Winners of the Stockholm Prize in Criminology